The Battle of Germantown on 4 October 1777 pitted a 9,000-man British army under General William Howe, 5th Viscount Howe against an 11,000-strong American army commanded by General George Washington. After an initial advance, the American reserve allowed itself to be diverted by 120 English soldiers holding out in the Benjamin Chew House. A heavy morning fog disoriented the American assault columns and led to a friendly fire incident between elements of Major General John Sullivan's right column and Major General Nathanael Greene's left column. At about this time, the American attack lost impetus and both columns retreated. Meanwhile, two wide flanking columns numbering 3,000 American militia had little effect on the outcome. American losses was numbered at 673 soldiers killed and wounded plus 400 captured, while the British suffered 520 casualties.

British Army order of battle

General Sir William Howe (9,000)

Picket
Brigadier General Sir William Erskine
 40th Foot, Lieutenant Colonel Thomas Musgrave
 1st Light Infantry Battalion, Lieutenant Colonel Robert Abercromby of Airthrey
 14 light companies
 2nd Light Infantry Battalion, Brigadier General Sir William Erskine, Major John Maitland
 14 light companies

Right Wing
General Sir William Howe
 Guards Brigade: Brigadier General Edward Mathew
 Elements of 1st Foot Guards, 2nd Foot Guards, and 3rd Foot Guards Regiments
 1st Battalion (488)
 Grenadier company, Lieutenant Colonel Sir George Osborn (124)
 Hyde's company (93)
 Wrottesley's company (91)
 Cox's company (90)
 Garth's company (90)
 2nd Battalion (451)
 Stephen's company (88)
 Murray's company (89)
 O'Hara's company (87)
 Martin's company (91)
 Light company, Lieutenant Colonel Osborn (96)
 1st Brigade: Major General James Grant
 4th Foot
 28th Foot
 49th Foot
 2nd Brigade: Major General Grant
 5th Foot
 27th Foot
 55th Foot
 Reinforcements: Lieutenant General Charles, Earl Cornwallis, Lieutenant Colonel Henry Monckton
 1st Grenadier Battalion
 2nd Grenadier Battalion, Lieutenant Colonel Henry Monckton
 Unbrigaded:
 Queen's Rangers: Colonel James Weymss
 Light Dragoons (2 squadrons)

Left Wing

Lieutenant General Wilhelm von Knyphausen
 Hessian Jaegers: Lieutenant Colonel Ludwig von Wurmb
 3rd Brigade: Major General Charles Grey
 15th Foot
 17th Foot
 44th Foot
 4th Brigade: Major General James Agnew
 33rd Foot
 37th Foot
 46th Foot
 64th Foot
 Hessian Brigade: Major General Johann Daniel Stirn
 Erbprinz Infantry Regiment
 Donop Infantry Regiment
 Reinforcements: Colonel Carl von Donop
 Grenadier Battalion Minningerode
 Grenadier Battalion Linsing

British and Hessian officers

American Army order of battle

General and Commander-in-Chief George Washington (8,000 regulars, 3,000 militia, 200 cavalry)

Right Wing Militia
Brigadier General John Armstrong Sr. (1,500)
 Pennsylvania Militia Brigade: Brigadier General James Potter
 four light cannons
 1st Philadelphia City Troop

Left Wing Militia
Brigadier General William Smallwood (1,500)
 Maryland Militia Brigade: Brigadier General Smallwood
 New Jersey Militia Brigade: Brigadier General David Forman

Right Wing Continentals

Major General John Sullivan
 Division: Major General Sullivan (1,000)
 1st Maryland Brigade: Colonel John Hoskins Stone
 1st Maryland Regiment, Colonel John Hoskins Stone
 3rd Maryland Regiment
 7th Maryland Regiment
 1st Delaware Regiment, Colonel David Hall
 2nd Maryland Brigade: Colonel Moses Hazen
 2nd Maryland Regiment
 4th Maryland Regiment, Colonel Josias Hall, Major John Eager Howard
 6th Maryland Regiment
 2nd Canadian Regiment, Colonel Moses Hazen

 Division: Brigadier General Anthony Wayne (2,000 including Conway)
 1st Pennsylvania Brigade: Colonel Thomas Hartley
 1st Pennsylvania Regiment
 2nd Pennsylvania Regiment
 7th Pennsylvania Regiment
 10th Pennsylvania Regiment, Lieutenant Colonel Adam Hubley
 Hartley's Additional Continental Regiment, Lieutenant Colonel Morgan Connor
 2nd Pennsylvania Brigade: Colonel Richard Humpton
 4th Pennsylvania Regiment
 5th Pennsylvania Regiment
 8th Pennsylvania Regiment
 11th Pennsylvania Regiment
 3rd Pennsylvania Brigade: Brigadier General Thomas Conway
 3rd Pennsylvania Regiment
 6th Pennsylvania Regiment, Lieutenant Colonel Josiah Harmar
 9th Pennsylvania Regiment
 12th Pennsylvania Regiment
 Cavalry:
 Delaware Horse: Captain Allen McLane
 1st Continental Light Dragoons detachment: Colonel Theodorick Bland
 4th Continental Light Dragoons detachment: Colonel Stephen Moylan

Left Wing Continentals

Major General Nathanael Greene
 Connecticut Brigade: Brigadier General Alexander McDougall (1,000)
 1st Connecticut Regiment
 2nd Connecticut Regiment
 4th Connecticut Regiment
 5th Connecticut Regiment, Colonel Philip Burr Bradley
 7th Connecticut Regiment
 Division: Major General Greene (1,500)
 1st Virginia Brigade: Brigadier General Peter Muhlenberg
 1st Virginia Regiment, Colonel James Hendricks
 5th Virginia Regiment, Colonel Josiah Parker
 9th Virginia Regiment, Colonel George Mathews (Lt. Col. John Sayres killed in action; Major Levin Joynes captured)
 13th Virginia Regiment, Colonel William Russell
 2nd Virginia Brigade: Brigadier General George Weedon
 2nd Virginia Regiment, Colonel Richard Parker
 6th Virginia Regiment, Colonel John Gibson
 10th Virginia Regiment, Colonel Edward Stevens
 14th Virginia Regiment, Colonel Charles Lewis
 Pennsylvania State Regiment, Colonel Walter Stewart

 Division: Major General Adam Stephen (1,500)
 3rd Virginia Brigade: Brigadier General William Woodford (absent)
 3rd Virginia Regiment, Lieutenant Colonel T. Will Heth
 7th Virginia Regiment, Colonel Alexander McClanachan
 11th Virginia Regiment, Lieutenant Colonel Christian Febiger
 15th Virginia Regiment
 4th Virginia Brigade: Brigadier General Charles Scott
 4th Virginia Regiment, Colonel Robert Lawson
 8th Virginia Regiment, Colonel Abraham Bowman (Major William Darke captured)
 12th Virginia Regiment, Colonel James Wood
 Cavalry: Brigadier General Count Casimir Pulaski

Reserve

Major General William Alexander, Lord Stirling (1,200)
 North Carolina Brigade: Brigadier General Francis Nash
 1st North Carolina Regiment, Colonel Thomas Clark
 2nd North Carolina Regiment
 3rd North Carolina Regiment, Colonel Jethro Sumner
 4th North Carolina Regiment
 5th North Carolina Regiment
 6th North Carolina Regiment
 7th North Carolina Regiment, Colonel James Hogun
 8th North Carolina Regiment
 9th North Carolina Regiment
 New Jersey Brigade: Brigadier General William Maxwell
 1st New Jersey Regiment, Colonel Matthias Ogden
 2nd New Jersey Regiment, Colonel Israel Shreve
 3rd New Jersey Regiment, Colonel Elias Dayton
 4th New Jersey Regiment
 Artillery: Brigadier General Henry Knox
 Pennsylvania Artillery: Colonel Thomas Proctor (two guns)

American officers

Notes

References

American Revolutionary War orders of battle